Aleksey Dmitriyevich Legchilin (born 11 April 1992) is a Belarusian professional football player who plays for Neman Grodno.

Career
Born in Grodno, Legchilin began playing football in FC Neman Grodno's youth system. He joined the senior team and made his Belarusian Premier League debut in 2009.

Honours
Dinamo Brest
Belarusian Cup winner: 2016–17, 2017–18
Belarusian Super Cup winner: 2018

References

External links

1992 births
Living people
Belarusian footballers
Association football midfielders
Belarus international footballers
FC Neman Grodno players
FC Minsk players
FC Dynamo Brest players